Ramesh Narayan Patil is an Indian politician and belongs to the Bharatiya Janata Party. On 10 July 2018, he was elected unopposed with 10 others to the Maharashtra Legislative Council.

Non political life 
Ramesh (dada) Narayan Patil was born 15 September 1955 in Talvali Navi Mumbai. Coming from a humble family of farmers and fishermen, he established the RNP Group in early 80's, currently having interest in Scaffolding, Concrete, Oil and foods, Real estate and others with offices in Navi Mumbai, Pune, Hyderabad and Visakhapatnam.

He has two sons, Vishal Patil, an industrialist and the Managing Director of the RNP Group and Chetan dada Patil the head of the youth wing of Koli Mahasangh.

Koli Mahasangh 
With community population of over 80 lacs spread across 30 districts of Maharashtra, the Koli community which is about 7% of the state population was fragmented and didn't have a unified voice. There was lot of perceived hardship and injustice towards the community but there was no one to take heed of it. Looking at the circumstances Koli Mahasangh was formed in the Year 2009 by the Koli community with Shri. Ramesh dada Patil as the President.

As president of the Koli Mahasangh, Ramesh Dada Patil looks after the interest and demands of the fisherman community of Maharashtra.

See also 
 List of Koli people
 List of Koli states and clans

References

Living people
Koli people
Indian National Congress politicians from Maharashtra
Year of birth missing (living people)
Bharatiya Janata Party politicians from Maharashtra